Goodnight Unknown is a solo studio album by Lou Barlow, the second with his real name; it was released in 2009 by Merge Records in the USA and by Domino Records in the UK.

Track listing
"Sharing"
"Goodnight Unknown" 
"Too Much Freedom" 
"Faith In Your Heartbeat" 
"The One I Call" 
"The Right" 
"Gravitate"
"I'm Thinking ..." 
"One Machine, One Long Fight" 
"Praise" 
"Take Advantage" 
"Modesty" 
"Don't Apologize" 
"One Note Tone"

Personnel
Lou Barlow – everything but the following
Imaad Wasif – guitar on tracks 2,3,5,6,10,11,13 (mantis mural at Ear Knife)
Dale Crover – drums on tracks 1,2,6,7,9,13
Adam Harding – vocals on track 11, percussion on track 5 (video stills in CD booklet)
Sebastian Steinberg – bass on tracks 7,11
Lisa Germano – vocals on track 3 
Murph additional drums on track 7

References 

2009 albums
Lou Barlow albums